Koga Michiteru (久我通光, Koga Michiteru, 1187 - 1248) was a waka poet and Japanese nobleman active in the early Kamakura period.

External links 
E-text of his poems in Japanese

1187 deaths
1248 deaths
People of Kamakura-period Japan
13th-century Japanese poets